Le Prussien is a 1971 French made-for-television film directed by Jean L'Hôte and starring Edmond Beauchamp. It is Isabelle Huppert's film debut.

Cast
 Edmond Beauchamp as Le 'Prussien'
 Françoise Lugagne as Lucie
 Alfred Adam as Victor
 Jacques Rispal as Auguste
 Denise Bailly as Madeleine
 Jeanne Hardeyn as Marguerite
 Mélanie Brévan as Marie-Thérèse
 Isabelle Huppert as Elisabeth
 Freddy Schluck as Jules
 Marc Chapiteau as Paul
 Max Doria as Alfred
 Andrée Tainsy as Yvonne
 Alexandre Rignault as Le notaire
 Jacques Maginot as Le fossoyeur

See also
 Isabelle Huppert on screen and stage

References

External links

1971 films
French television films
Films directed by Jean L'Hôte
1970s French-language films
1970s French films